Yarmouth may refer to:

Places

Canada
Yarmouth County, Nova Scotia
Yarmouth, Nova Scotia
Municipality of the District of Yarmouth
Yarmouth (provincial electoral district)
Yarmouth (electoral district) 
Yarmouth Township, Ontario
New Yarmouth, Nova Scotia

United Kingdom
Yarmouth, the common name of Great Yarmouth, a town in Norfolk
Great Yarmouth (UK Parliament constituency)
Borough of Great Yarmouth, a local government district
Yarmouth, Isle of Wight
Yarmouth (Isle of Wight) (UK Parliament constituency) (former UK Parliament constituency)
Yarmouth Castle, a fortress guarding Yarmouth harbour

United States
Yarmouth, Iowa
Yarmouth, Maine
Yarmouth (CDP), Maine
North Yarmouth, Maine
Yarmouth, Massachusetts
South Yarmouth, Massachusetts
West Yarmouth, Massachusetts
Yarmouth Port, Massachusetts

People 
Earl of Yarmouth, British peerage title
Lord Yarmouth (1777–1842), English amateur cricketer
Brandon from Yarmouth, world champion from the wka

Ships 
County of Yarmouth, a fully rigged ship
SS Great Yarmouth (1866), a freight ship built for the Great Eastern Railway
HMS Yarmouth, various British navy vessels
SS Yarmouth (1887), a steamship operating Nova Scotia and flagship of the Black Star Line
SS Yarmouth (1903), a steel-hulled steamship owned by the Great Eastern Railway
SS Yarmouth (1927), sister of the American steamship Yarmouth Castle
SS Yarmouth Castle (1927), an American steamship lost in a fire in 1965

Other 
Yarmouth (Cambridge, Maryland), a historic home in Maryland
Yarmouthian (stage), also called Yarmouth Interglacial
Yarmouth Toller, a breed of gundog
"Yarmouth Town", traditional English song about Great Yarmouth.

See also

Great Yarmouth (disambiguation)